Frank Weir (21 January 1903 – 17 June 1969) was a New Zealand cricketer. He played three first-class matches for Auckland in 1927/28.

See also
 List of Auckland representative cricketers

References

External links
 

1903 births
1969 deaths
New Zealand cricketers
Auckland cricketers
Cricketers from Auckland